Nik Razboršek (born 4 October 1993) is an inactive Slovenian tennis player.

Razboršek has a career high ATP singles ranking of 409 achieved on 17 December 2018. He also has a career high ATP doubles ranking of 625 achieved on 17 July 2017.

Razboršek has represented Slovenia at Davis Cup, where he has a win–loss record of 1–2. He is a left-handed player with a double-handed backhand.

Future and Challenger finals

Singles: 8 (5–3)

Doubles 11 (4–7)

Davis Cup

Singles performances (1-2)

References

External links
 
 
 

Slovenian male tennis players
Living people
Sportspeople from Ljubljana
1993 births
People from the Municipality of Litija